Ceres station is a future Altamont Corridor Express rail station in the city of the same name. It was expected to open to revenue service in 2024 as the terminus of the first phase of ACE's expansion to Merced, but the opening was later pushed back to 2026. The station is located between Railroad Avenue and CA 99 near the southbound Whitmore Avenue exit underpass; the platform is only accessible approaching from the east side of the tracks. A bus will connect to Merced at first, with rail service to follow in the future. Parking will be available on nearby surface streets.

References

Ceres, California
Future Altamont Corridor Express stations
Railway stations scheduled to open in 2026
Railway stations in Stanislaus County, California